The Chinese Elm cultivar Ulmus parvifolia 'Frosty' was intended primarily as a dwarf variety.

Description
The tree is distinguished by its small leaves, which rarely exceed 18 mm in length and feature irregular white margins.

Pests and diseases
The species and its cultivars are highly resistant, but not immune, to Dutch elm disease, and unaffected by the Elm Leaf Beetle Xanthogaleruca luteola.

Cultivation
'Frosty' is relatively common in cultivation on both sides of the Atlantic.

Accessions

North America

Dawes Arboretum , Newark, Ohio, US. 1 tree, no acc. details available.
Denver Botanic Gardens, US. No details available
Holden Arboretum, US. Acc. no. 85-176
Smith College, US. Acc. no. 23703

Europe

Clapton Court, Somerset, UK. TROBI Champion, 7 m high, d.b.h. 14 cm in 2006 
Royal Horticultural Society Gardens, Wisley, UK. No details available
Sir Harold Hillier Gardens, UK. Acc. no. 1982.0008

Nurseries

North America

Widely available.

Europe

Widely available.

Australasia

Yamina Rare Plants , Monbulk, Melbourne, Australia.

References

Chinese elm cultivar
Ulmus articles with images
Ulmus